Aleksandr Borisovich Kozhukhov (3 June 1942 – 4 September 2008) was "The USSR Merited Master of Sports", "The Merited Coach of the USSR national handball team", and the "USSR Merited Figure of Physical Culture". He was a Russian, Soviet handball player, who became president of the USSR Handball Federation (1990–1992) and a president for the Handball Union of Russia (1992–2004) before being the Honorary President of the Handball Union of Russia (2004–2008).

Life and career

Kozhukhov was born in Shubarkuduk village of Aktobe Province of modern Kazakhstan.  He started his handball career in 1957 as an amateur player, then he was invited to join Avangard L'vov a second division handball team in the USSR Handball Championship.

Aleksandr stayed for eleven years in Lvov city of modern Ukraine playing for Avangard Lvov and SKA Lvov before he moved to MIA Moscow in 1968 where he started a career, winning the USSR Handball Championship for five times.

In 1967 Kozhukhov was called up to the national team when he made his first appearance during the Military Spartakiad of the Friendly Armies of the Socialist Countries and a third-place finish for the USSR. He also participated in the 1970 World Men's Handball Championship in France, finishing ninth, coming third in group stage after Sweden and East Germany.

Kozhukhov retired in 1977 and became the head coach for the USSR handball national team.

Aleksandr remained as the USSR handball national team head coach until 1992 even after he was elected by the Congress of the Handball Union of the USSR to be the president of the Union until the dissolution of the USSR. In 1992 the second conference of the Handball Union of Russia was held in Volgograd, and Sasha was elected the first president of the Handball Union of the independat Russian Federation following Vladimir Maksimov the president of the Handball Union of RSFSR. In 1993 Sasha became a member of the Executive Committee of the Russian Olympic Committee, till he finally became the Honorary President of the Handball Union of Russia in 2004.

Kozhukhov died in 2008.

Honours

MIA Moscow

 Champions of the USSR Handball Championship: 1968, 1970, 1972, 1974, 1975

USSR

 Champion of the Trade Unions Spartakiade in 1969
 Bronze medal of the Military Spartakiade of Friendly Armies of Socialist Countries in 1967

HUR President

 IHF Ring of Honour
 Silver Olympic Order
 Hans Baumann Trophy in 2002

Individual

 Medal "For Distinguished Labour"
 Medal "For Labour Valour"
 Order of the Badge of Honor
 Order of Honour
 Order For Merit to the Fatherland (4th Class)

References

External links
 Honorary President of the Handball Union of Russia (Russian) (English)
 IHF mourns passing of Alexander Kozhukhov
 Handball world mourns death of Alexander Kozhukhov

1942 births
2008 deaths
Russian male handball players
Soviet male handball players
Presidents of the Handball Union of Russia
Burials in Troyekurovskoye Cemetery
People from Aktobe Region